Pangolinisis is a genus of deep-sea bamboo coral in the family Isididae. It is monotypic with a single species, Pangolinisis cia.

References

Isididae
Octocorallia genera